David Sheftell  (born January 9, 1987) is an American film, television and voice actor known for playing Deputy Evan Olson in the 2021 film, Willy's Wonderland with Nicolas Cage and his recurring voice roles on Family Guy and American Dad.

Early life and career
Sheftell is originally from Calabasas, California. He studied theatre and television at Pepperdine University in Malibu and was the first two-term President of the Pepperdine Improv Troupe. Shortly after graduating from Pepperdine, Sheftell was cast in his first roles in the shows The Young and the Restless and Days of Our Lives. He also appeared in Ryde Share, a 2014 award-winning comedy short written by Jeff Loveness. Sheftell has dual citizenship in the U.S. and Australia. He lives in Los Angeles, California and is CEO of Manticore Pictures.

Filmography

Film

Television

References

External links
 
 

1987 births
Living people